The Municipality of Središče ob Dravi is a municipality in the traditional region of Styria in northeastern Slovenia. The seat of the municipality is the town of Središče ob Dravi. Središče ob Dravi became a municipality in 2006.

Settlements
In addition to the municipal seat of Središče ob Dravi, the municipality also includes the following settlements:
 Godeninci
 Grabe
 Obrež
 Šalovci

References

External links

Municipality of Središče ob Dravi on Geopedia
Municipality of Središče ob Dravi website

Sredisce ob Dravi
2006 establishments in Slovenia